Sano Cricket Ground is a cricket ground in Sano, Japan. The ground is one of the few facilities in Japan that is used for cricket. The pitch is made of plastic carpet and is in pretty good condition.  The ground is also used for baseball.

The stadium is a headquarters of the Japan Cricket Association and has hosted a number of cricket games between international teams.

On March 22, 2016, Sano City Council announced that Tanuma High School Ground would become the Sano International Cricket Ground which will become Japan's first dedicated cricketing venue built for purpose which no longer has to compete with other sports for usage. The ground hosted first ever East Asia Cup which included national teams of China and South Korea as well as Hong Kong Dragons (an all Chinese development team) and the host Japan.

In June 2019, the ground hosted the matches in the East Asia Pacific qualification tournament for the 2020 Under-19 Cricket World Cup. Japan national under-19 cricket team won the tournament after Papua New Guinea forfeited the last match, qualifying for its first ever World Cup appearance.

See also
Cricket in Japan
Japan men's national cricket team
Japan women's national cricket team
Japan Cricket Association
ICC East Asia-Pacific
Asian Cricket Council

References

External links
 wikimapia
 Sano International Cricket Ground at Japan Cricket Association
 Sano International Cricket Ground at CricketArchive
 Sano International Cricket Ground at ESPN Cricinfo

Cricket grounds in Japan
Baseball venues in Japan
Multi-purpose stadiums in Japan
Sports venues in Tochigi Prefecture
Sports venues completed in 2009